Trammel is an unincorporated community in Dickenson County, Virginia, United States. Trammel had a post office with ZIP code 24289 from October 8, 1919, to November 16, 2002; the community is now part of ZIP code 24237.

Trammel was first settled by a farmer named Hiram Keith. The first school in Trammel, known as the Delphia School, opened in 1898; a new schoolhouse was built for the school in 1924. The Carolina, Clinchfield and Ohio Railway began building a line through Dickenson County in 1913 and drove the last spike in Trammel in 1915; service to the community began in 1916.

Coal mining was the primary industry at Trammel in the 1920s.

References

Unincorporated communities in Dickenson County, Virginia
Unincorporated communities in Virginia